Peter Demong is a municipal politician who currently serves as Councillor of Ward 14 in Calgary, Alberta. He was first elected in 2010.

Career before politics

Prior to being elected in 2010, Demong was a logistics manager at Nose Creek Forest Products. With his wife Naomi, Demong owned and operated Deer Valley Florist from 1996 to 2015.

Electoral record

2010 municipal election

Demong was first elected to serve Ward 14 in the 2010 election, taking 29% of the votes while defeating incumbent Linda Fox-Mellway.

2013 municipal election

Demong was reelected in the 2013 election by capturing 67% of the votes.

References

External links 
 City of Calgary Ward 14 homepage

Living people
Calgary city councillors
Year of birth missing (living people)